Riding After Midnight is the third solo album by the English singer-songwriter Clint Bradley, released in 2014, on the Bluelight Records label. It is his first dedicated Western music album.

Track listing

Personnel
Clint Bradley - vocals, acoustic guitar, harmonies, and pen
Nick Evans - acoustic guitar, Dobro, mandolin, and banjo
Danny Kelly - drums and percussion
Connie Everard - double bass
Darren Allison - guitar ("Pilgrim Boy" & "Six Strings") and percussion ("We Are Shane")

Production
Produced by Darren Allison and Clint Bradley.
Recorded and mixed by Darren Allison.

References

External links 
 

2014 albums